Fort Knox may refer to:

 Fort Knox United States Army post in Kentucky
 Fort Knox, Kentucky, census-designated place
 Fort Knox (Maine), historic fort in Maine, United States
 Fort Knox I, Fort Knox II, Northwest Territory forts from 1787 to 1813
 United States Bullion Depository located at Fort Knox
 Fort Knox (comic)
 Fort Knox Gold Mine, an open pit mine near Fairbanks, Alaska
 Fort Knox, the codename of a failed project at IBM to consolidate their midrange systems.